OneID is a digital security service based in Redwood City, California. OneID sells a digital identity system that claims to provide security across all devices using public key cryptography instead of passwords. The technology is utilized by non-profits, such as Salsa Labs, to increase the frequency and security of online donations.

History

The company was founded in 2011 by serial entrepreneur, Steve Kirsch. Kirsch recruited engineers Jim Fenton, Adam Back, and Bobby Beckmann to create the flagship product, which was launched in early 2012. Following the launch, the company raised US$7 million in venture capital financing from Menlo Park-based venture capital firm  Khosla Ventures.

Following their Series A, Alex Doll took over the position as CEO. Doll was previously an executive-in-residence as Khosla Ventures, and before that was a founding executive at PGP Corp. With Doll's appointment, founder Kirsch moved into the CTO role. Shirish Sathaye, general partner at Khosla Ventures, and Jonathan Heiliger were added to OneID's board of directors.

Following a growth period in late 2013, the company appointed  Kirsch CEO.

In 2014, Fast Company named OneID one of the top 10 most innovative companies in finance.

In August 2016, OneID was acquired by Neustar.

See also

 Two Factor Authentication

References

External links
 

2011 establishments in California
Companies based in Redwood City, California
Companies established in 2011
Computer security software companies